See also Henry Balfour (MP for Fifeshire)

Henry Balfour FRS FRAI (11 April 1863 – 9 February 1939) was a British archaeologist, and the first curator of the Pitt Rivers Museum.

He was President of the Royal Anthropological Institute, Museums Association, Folklore Society, Royal Geographical Society, and a Fellow of the Royal Society.

Biography 
Henry Balfour, the only son of Lewis Balfour (1833–1885), a silk broker from Croydon, and Sarah Walker Comber (1836–1916), was born in 1863. His parents married on 28 July 1857. He had two older sisters: Edith Balfour (born c. 1859) and Marian Balfour (born c. 1860). His father died on 1 May 1885, at 15 Hanover Terrace, Regent's Park, London, at 52 years of age.

In 1887, Henry married Edith Marie Louise Wilkins, the only daughter of Robert Francis Wilkins of Kingswear, south Devon. They had one son, Lewis Balfour (1887–1974). The Balfours lived at 11 Norham Gardens, Oxford before moving to Langley Lodge, Headington, Oxford later in life. A few months after the death of his wife, Balfour died at his home in Headington, Oxford, on 9 February 1939.

Balfour was educated at Charterhouse and Trinity College, Oxford (matriculated 1881–graduated 1885), and took Honours Mods and later the final school of animal morphology in 1885. In 1884, the University of Oxford accepted the collection of ethnological and archaeological specimens made and arranged by General Augustus Pitt Rivers. Professor H. N. Moseley, in whose charge the Pitt Rivers Museum was placed by the University, invited Balfour, who was one of his students, to assist in the installation of the collection in the new museum building. Moseley had recognized the keen and alert intelligence of Balfour, his love of animals, and his skill as a draughtsman. 

Balfour continued to work under Moseley's supervision until Moseley's death in 1891 when the responsibility devolved on Balfour. Balfour was appointed Curator in 1893 and continued in that position until his death. That a large and unique museum has grown up around the original nucleus of the Pitt Rivers collection is due to Balfour's erudition and devotion.

Specimens of the arts and crafts of various peoples had long been collected in museums and were regarded as little more than curiosities or trophies, but owing to the work of Colonel Lane-Fox they acquired a new significance. In 1851 Augustus H. Lane Fox (later Pitt Rivers) began to collect specimens of firearms to illustrate his recognition that every noteworthy advancement in the efficiency, not only of the weapon but also of every individual detail in its structure, was arrived at as a cumulative result of a succession of very slight modifications, each of which was but a trifling improvement upon the one immediately preceding it. He was led to believe that the same principle most probably governs the development of the other arts, appliances, and ideas of mankind. Forthwith he began to build the ethnological collection, though under the name of Pitt Rivers, which he assumed in 1880. 

Unlike other collectors, there was invariably some principle of a theory that the objects he collected were designed to illustrate. The spoils of over twenty years of collecting were exhibited in 1874 in the Bethnal Green Museum. The collection was a revelation to students and was the first application of the theory of evolution to objects made by man. The validity of the general views of Colonel Lane Fox as to the evolution of the material arts of man was rapidly accepted by a large number of ethnologists and others.

As palaeontology is ancient zoology, so archaeology is ancient ethnology; by bringing together the archaeological and ethnological material, Pitt Rivers sought to make each elucidate the other. From the archaeological record, a sequence could be derived, but with many gaps. Rivers sought to fill these gaps from evidence derived from a study of the recent primitive peoples. The culture of the modern stone-age man he regarded as more or less direct survival from that of ancient stone-age man, arguing that much which is obscure in the culture of prehistoric times may be elucidated by reference to recent primitive peoples.

Balfour stated in his Presidential Address to the Somersetshire Archaeological and Natural History Society in 1919:

Arguing from the known to the inknown, ese modern survivals of early cultures have been used, as far as possible, to complete the picture of the life and industries of Prehistoric Man. From the combined material derived from ancient and modern times series were created to show, tentatively at any rate, how the more developed types of appliances were arrived at by successive slight improvements from their simple and generalized prototypes.

Incidentally these typological series serve to demonstrate the geographical distribution of particular arts, industries, and appliances, a matter which is becoming recognized as increasingly important, as affording valuable clues to the intricate problems of racial dispersal and migration routes, and as supplying evidence of the culture-contact between various peoples not necessarily related to one another.

Balfour went on to say, "In studying the development of human arts, it must not be supposed that progress was effected by a simple process of what is known as 'end-on' evolution, the successive morphological changes following one another in simple unilinear series".

Works 
Although he only wrote one book, The Evolution of Decorative Art (1893), Balfour published numerous scholarly articles, often taking a specific type of object – from musical bows to fire-pistons or fishing-kites – and exploring its "evolutionary development" through history and across different cultures.

References

Attribution
 This article incorporates text from a publication now in the public domain:

External links

Archaeologists from London
1863 births
1939 deaths
People educated at Charterhouse School
Fellows of the Royal Society
Presidents of the Royal Geographical Society
People from Croydon
People associated with the Pitt Rivers Museum
Fellows of the Royal Anthropological Institute of Great Britain and Ireland
Presidents of the Royal Anthropological Institute of Great Britain and Ireland
Presidents of the Folklore Society